Roly Castle is a château-ferme, or fortified farmhouse, in Roly in the municipality of Philippeville, province of Namur, Wallonia, Belgium.

The existence of a fortification, in the form of a tower, is recorded here as early as 1069, but the present donjon dates from the 13th century, and this is the oldest extant part of the buildings. Major restorations and reconstructions took place in 1616 and between 1746 and 1749, and as of 2010 the buildings are again undergoing restoration.

Besides the donjon, the castle contains extensive domestic ranges and numerous service and outbuildings. The whole complex is surrounded on two sides by moats.

The castle also contains a private chapel, dedicated to Saint Anthony.

See also
List of castles in Belgium

External links
Contact information Roly castle, Pays de Vallees, Province of Namur Tourist office

Castles in Belgium
Castles in Namur (province)
Philippeville